Panchla Mahavidyalaya, established in 2010, is an undergraduate college at Panchla in Howrah district, West Bengal, India. This college is affiliated to the University of Calcutta.

Departments

Arts
Bengali
English
History
Political Science
Education

See also 
List of colleges affiliated to the University of Calcutta
Education in India
Education in West Bengal

References

External links
http://www.panchlamahavidyalaya.in/index

Educational institutions established in 2010
University of Calcutta affiliates
Universities and colleges in Howrah district
2010 establishments in West Bengal